The Fight for Saturday Night is a British television documentary that aired on BBC Four in December 2014, presented by former BBC One controller Michael Grade.

Shows featured

The Generation Game
The Two Ronnies
Match of the Day
The Big Match
The Late, Late Breakfast Show
Noel's House Party
Who Wants to Be A Millionaire?
Friends Like These
Pop Idol
Strictly Come Dancing
The X Factor

Reviews
Will Dean in The Independent headlined his review "Top marks for Michael Grade's illuminating look at television's golden age" and praised the show for not trying to frame the subject in terms of any social change that was happening at the time, praising the format of Grade simply talking to people involved in the shows covered, calling it "...simple, effective programme-making"

References

External links

2014 British television series debuts
2014 British television series endings
BBC television documentaries
Television series about television